The siege of Falaise  took place in 1450 during the Hundred Years War when French forces laid siege to Falaise in the English-controlled Duchy of Normandy following their decisive victory at the Battle of Formigny.

References
Nicolle, David. The Fall of English France 1449–53. Bloomsbury Publishing, 2012. 

Sieges of the Hundred Years' War
1450 in England
1450s in France
Conflicts in 1450
Hundred Years' War, 1415–1453